Michael John Smedley (born 28 October 1941) is an English former first-class cricketer. He began his career with Yorkshire and played for the Second XI 1960–62. In 1963, he joined Nottinghamshire and made his first-class debut in 1964. Smedley, right-handed, was a specialist middle order batsman. He was awarded his county cap in 1966 and had his benefit season in 1975, which raised £8,500. He assumed the club captaincy in 1975 and held the post for five seasons until his retirement in 1979.

References

External links
 

1941 births
Living people
English cricketers
Nottinghamshire cricketers
Nottinghamshire cricket captains
Marylebone Cricket Club cricketers
A. E. R. Gilligan's XI cricketers
International Cavaliers cricketers